Abdessamad Oukhelfen (born 18 December 1998) is a Spanish middle- and long-distance runner. He won bronze medals in the 5000 metres at the 2019 European Under-23 Championships and for the U23 race at the 2019 European Cross Country Championships.

Oukhelfen was the 5000 m 2020 Spanish national champion.

In 2021, he won the Cross Internacional de la Constitución 10.06 km cross-country race held in Alcobendas, Spain.

Personal bests
 1500 metres – 3:40.45 (Barcelona 2022)
 3000 metres – 7:45.24 (Barcelona 2020)
 3000 metres indoor – 7:55.26 (Metz 2021)
 5000 metres – 13:17.95 (Ostrava 2020)
 10,000 metres – 28:30.03 (Burjassot 2019)
Road
 5 kilometres – 13:37 (Barcelona 2022)
 10 kilometres – 28:51 (Barcelona 2018)

References

1998 births
Living people
Spanish male long-distance runners